The Rutledge Court refers to the Supreme Court of the United States from June to December 1795, when John Rutledge served as the second Chief Justice of the United States. Rutledge took office as a recess appointment of President George Washington to succeed John Jay. However, Rutledge was denied confirmation by the United States Senate, partly due to his attacks on the Jay Treaty. Rutledge was succeeded in office by Oliver Ellsworth. This was the first time that the Senate rejected a Supreme Court nomination; it remains the only time a "recess appointed" justice was not subsequently confirmed by the Senate.

Rutledge's tenure as Chief Justice lasted for only . As a result, the court only decided two cases under his leadership.

Membership

The Rutledge Court consisted of Rutledge and five Associate Justices from the Jay Court: William Cushing, James Wilson, John Blair Jr., James Iredell, and William Paterson. Blair resigned on October 25, 1795, and was subsequently replaced by Samuel Chase in February 1796.

Timeline

Rulings of the Court

The Rutledge Court, due in part to its brevity, issued only two rulings:

United States v. Peters (1795): In a unanimous opinion authored by Chief Justice Rutledge, the Court ruled that federal district courts had no jurisdiction over crimes committed against Americans in international waters.
 Talbot v. Janson (1795): In an opinion by Justice Paterson, the Court held that a citizen of the United States did not waive all claims to U.S. citizenship by either renouncing citizenship of an individual state or by becoming a citizen of another country, thus establishing precedent allowing for multiple citizenship by Americans.

Other branches
The President during this court was George Washington. The Congress during this court was the 4th United States Congress.

References

1790s in the United States
United States Supreme Court history by court